Naukati Bay Seaplane Base, formerly known as Nichin Cove Seaplane Base , is a public use seaplane base located at Nichin Cove on the east side of Tuxekan Island, in the Prince of Wales-Hyder Census Area (formerly Prince of Wales-Outer Ketchikan Census Area) of the U.S. state of Alaska.

Facilities and aircraft 
Naukati Bay Seaplane Base resides at elevation of 0 feet (0 m) above mean sea level. It has two seaplane landing areas: one designated N/S with a water surface measuring 10,000 by 1,000 feet (3,048 x 305 m) and another designated NE/SW which is 10,000 by 300 feet (3,048 x 91 m). For the 12-month period ending December 31, 2006, the facility had 300 aircraft operations, an average of 25 per month: 83% air taxi and 17% general aviation.

References

External links 

Seaplane bases in Alaska
Airports in the Prince of Wales–Hyder Census Area, Alaska